In patent law, a search report is a report established by a patent office, which mentions documents which may be taken into consideration in deciding whether the invention to which a patent application relates is patentable. The documents mentioned in the search report usually form part of the prior art.

Patent law

Categories of documents 
Letters are often included in search reports established for patent applications to indicate the relevance of the documents identified by the examiner. For instance, the European Patent Office (EPO) uses the following letters in search reports or in the European Patent Register:

Combinations of different categories are possible. For instance, a document classified as "D, A", i.e. in categories "D" and "A", would be a document cited in the application and regarded as representing the technological background of the invention.

See also
 Office action
 Grant procedure before the European Patent Office
 Patent analysis

References

External links
 : "Search report"
 Patent Factsheet: Search Report at the UK Intellectual Property Office (UKIPO)
 1844.01 Preparing the International Search Report (Form PCT/ISA/210) R-6 - 1800 Patent Cooperation Treaty at the United States Patent and Trademark Office (USPTO) (with example of international search report)

Copyright law
Patent law